Tornabous is a village and municipality in the province of Lleida and autonomous community of Catalonia, Spain. The municipality includes the village of El Tarròs, where there is an interpretive centre dedicated to Catalan patriot Lluís Companys, who was born there.

References

External links
 
 Government data pages 

Municipalities in Urgell